The Battle of Narmada (Kannada : ನರ್ಮದೆ ಕದನ) was fought between king Pulakeshin II of Chalukya dynasty and king Harshavardhana of Pushyabhuti dynasty on the banks of the river Narmada, India. The battle resulted in the great victory of Pulakeshin II and retreat of Harsha and his forces

Batte at Narmada 
The Aihole inscription of Pulakeshin boasts the harsha (mirth) of Harsha melted away by fear, as his elephants fell in the battle. The only other inscription from his reign that mentions this battle is the Bijapur-Mumbai inscription.

The Rashtrakutas, who ultimately overthrew the Chalukyas several years after Pulakeshin's death, also boast that they defeated the dynasty that claimed victory over Harshavardhana, thus indirectly confirming Pulakeshin's achievement.

The Aihole inscription poetically states that Pulakeshin's elephants had to avoid the neighbourhood of the Vindhya mountains beside the Narmada River, because they "by their bulk, rivalled the mountains". Historian K. A. Nilakanta Sastri interprets to mean that Pulakeshin "did not send his elephant forces into the difficult Vindhya terrain", and guarded the passes with infantry. According to Shreenand L. Bapat and Pradeep S. Sohoni, the inscription suggests that Pulakeshin's army subsequently tried to cross the Vindhyas, in a bid to invade Harsha's kingdom, but was unsuccessful, which may explain why only two inscriptions from Pulakeshin's reign mention his conflict with Harsha.

Aftermath 
The title of Paramesvara, i.e., ‘the great lord or the lord of lords’, was adopted by Pulakesin II after defeating Harshavardhana of the North, The Rashtrakuta records also narrate that they defeated the army of Vallabha or the Karnataka Bala which was boasting of its victories over the Pallavas, Keralas, Pandyas, Cholas, Harshavardhana and Vajrata, thus indirectly confirming the claim of the Chalukyan inscriptions defeating Harsha

In popular culture 
Several Kannadiga communities celebrate this victory as a great event of over throwing the suzerainty of North. Former Chief minister of Karnataka Siddaramaiah has also mentioned it to be a powerful victory and deriding for the ‘northern imports’ are among attempts to brand himself as a strong southern satrap, following the 7th century Chalukya king Pulakeshin. Kannada actor Dhananjaya also said he is not interested in statues but people should read about Pulikeshi II and king Pulakeshin II is one of the inspiration for him and for the Kannadiga community

References

Bibliography  
 
 
 
 

History of India
Chalukya dynasty
Pushyabhuti dynasty